The Climate of Grand Forks, North Dakota is a warm summer continental (Köppen Dfb) typical of cities located in the Great Plains, with four very distinct seasons and great variation in temperatures over very short periods of time. The city's climate is characterized by long, cold winters with moderate snowfall and warm summers which are typically humid.

Temperature
Grand Forks lies in the middle of the North American continent on low-lying, flat land. Since it is located in the Great Plains, it has an extreme continental climate, in that there are great differences between summer and winter temperatures. As there are no nearby mountain ranges or bodies of water to ameliorate the winter climatic conditions, Grand Forks lies exposed to numerous weather systems including bitterly cold Arctic high pressure systems. This can result in bone-chilling temperatures as early as the end of October, followed by bitter cold temperatures and readings during December, January and February. During these three months, the high reaches freezing on only 18 days, and the low falls below  for 50 days per year. Cold weather and snow will occasionally extend into April, although in general the winter weather begins to moderate in late February or early March.

Summers are typically warm with varying degrees of humidity. Depending on the year, warm weather can continue beyond to October, or come to an abrupt end soon after Labor Day. The city often receives an Indian Summer, when summer weather returns briefly after the first frosts, in mid to late October, or even early November.

Precipitation
The wettest month is June and the driest is December, and precipitation is concentrated from May to September. There is generally snow cover from mid-November to the end of March, though this varies depending on the year—heavy snowfalls in late October and in April are not uncommon. The city averages  of snow per season.

Statistics

References

External links
NWS Grand Forks, ND Home Page - US National Weather Service Station site
National Weather Service Climate - Climate Data for NWS Grand Forks
Climate history for Grand Forks at WeatherUnderground.com

Grand Forks, North Dakota
Grand Forks
Grand Forks